The Wilkes-Barre Barons were an Anthracite League American football team that, according to historical records, played in only one game in the league's only year of existence, 1924.

Their lone game was played on October 5 against the Pottsville Maroons. The Barons lost the match 34-0.

References

American football teams established in 1924
Defunct American football teams in Pennsylvania
Wilkes-Barre, Pennsylvania
Sports in the Scranton–Wilkes-Barre metropolitan area
Anthracite League teams
American football teams disestablished in 1924
1924 establishments in Pennsylvania
1924 disestablishments in Pennsylvania